Spellanza Baguma Muhenda  (October 30, 1978) is a member of the Ugandan Parliament.

She is the Woman District Representative for Kyenjojo District in the Tooro sub-region in the Western Uganda who is affiliated to the National Resistance Movement (NRM).

Background and education 
Spellanza Baguma Muhenda was born on 30 October 1978 in a catholic family. She finished her Uganda Certificate of Education from Kyebambe Girls S.S. in 1996. she remained at Kyebambe Girls S.S where she completed her Uganda Advanced Certificate of Education in 1998. She then went to 2002 Makerere University from where she graduated with Bachelor of Education. She went for further studies at Law Development Centre, Kampala from where she got a Certificate in Law (Administrative Officers Law Course) in 2006. And in 2008, she got her Postgraduate Diploma in Public Administration and Management from Uganda Management Institute.

Career 
From 2000 to 2002, Spellanza Baguma Muhenda was a trainer at Ruwoda. She became the Programme Officer of youth organization Engabu za Tooro from 2002 - 2003. She was also an Executive Director for Protect the Children-Kyenjojo from 2004 to 2006. She became a Councilor for Kyenjojo District Local Government from 2002 to 2006. She was District Registrar for the National Resistance Movement in 2006. At Kyenjojo District Local Government rom 2006–2010, Baguma was Senior Assistant Secretary. She was also a Senior Assistant Secretary for Kyegegwa District Local Government from 2010 to 2015. She became a Member of Parliament in the Parliament of Uganda in 2016 to date.

She is also a member of Local Government Accounts Committee and also a member on the committee on Public Service and Local Government. She was the vice-president of the Parliamentary Health Committee in the 10th parliament of Uganda and a champion on sexual reproductive health issues.

She is the current Chairperson of the Network for African Women Ministers and Parliamentarians (NAWMP).

She presented a motion demanding that the government implement key policies that would impact the lives of young people. She has always expressed concern about the performance of district health workers. She has always participated in the betterment of education. She participated in formulation of private health insurance scheme.

See also 

 Parliament of Uganda
 Kyenjojo District
 National Resistance Movement
List of members of the tenth Parliament of Uganda

External links 

 Website of the Parliament of Uganda

References 

1978 births
Living people
Women members of the Parliament of Uganda
People from Kyenjojo District
National Resistance Movement politicians
Members of the Parliament of Uganda